OpenDNSSEC is a computer program that manages the security of domain names on the Internet. The project intends to drive adoption of Domain Name System Security Extensions (DNSSEC) to further enhance Internet security.

OpenDNSSEC was created as an open-source turn-key solution for DNSSEC. It secures DNS zone data just before it is published in an authoritative name server. OpenDNSSEC takes in unsigned zones, adds digital signatures and other records for DNSSEC and passes it on to the authoritative name servers for that zone. All keys are stored in a hardware security module and accessed via PKCS #11, a standard software interface for communicating with devices which hold cryptographic information and perform cryptographic functions. 

OpenDNSSEC uses the Botan cryptographic library, and SQLite or MySQL as database back-end. It is used on the .se, .dk, .nl and .uk top-level domains.

See also

References

External links 
 
 
 

Domain Name System
DNS software
Free network-related software